Quaid-e-Azam Business Park Sheikhupura is an industrial area being developed by the Punjab government. Previously it was named Quaid-e-azam Apparel Park; the name was changed in November 2019. 
The Chief Minister of the Punjab, Sardar Usman Ahmad Khan Buzdar said that the Quaid-e-Azam Business Park in Sheikhupura will go a long way in boosting industrialization in Pakistan and it would create approximately half million jobs while a labour colony will also be built in the Quaid-e-Azam business park at the land of 200 acres



Location

This business park is spread over 1536 acres of land located on the M2 Lahore-Islamabad Motorway near Sheikhupura.

Preferred industries

Twelve industries are nominated as preferred industries for this industrial area: manufacturing services, auto parts, pharmaceuticals, chemicals, light engineering, plastics, information technology, electronics, food and beverages, logistics, mobile manufacturing and warehousing.

Development status

Prime Minister of Pakistan Imran Khan was scheduled to inaugurate the business park in March 2020, but this was delayed due to the COVID-19 pandemic. Punjab Industrial Estates Development and Management Company (PIEDMC) claims that more than 300 national and multinational companies have shown interest in establishing industrial units in the business park.

Economic zone status
This business park has been declared a special economic zone by the Pakistani government.

Project Launch

Quaid-e-Azam Business Park Sheikhupura has been officially launched on 18th July 2020. Its groundbreaking was done by Prime Minister Imran Khan.

References 

Departments of Government of Punjab, Pakistan
Economy of Punjab, Pakistan